David Hahn (born 1955 in Omaha, Nebraska) is an American businessman and the CEO of Internet development company New Digital Group and was the Democratic nominee for Governor of Nebraska in 2006.

Biography

Hahn was born in Omaha, Nebraska in 1955 and spent most of his youth in Schuyler and Stromsburg, Nebraska. When he was 15 years old, his family moved to Mount Vernon, Ohio, and he graduated from Mount Vernon High School in 1973. In 1978, he graduated from Sterling College in Kansas with a bachelor's degree in political science and philosophy. His undergraduate education included a year studying philosophy and theology at Phillips University in Marburg, Germany. After college, he returned to his home state and obtained a J.D. degree in 1981 from the University of Nebraska.

Hahn practiced law throughout the 1980s in Kearney, Nebraska, Lincoln, Nebraska, and Santa Fe, New Mexico. His hobby of software development eventually grew into New Digital Group, a company he founded in 1995.

Hahn announced his intention to run for Governor of Nebraska in December 2005. His only competition in the Democratic primary was Glenn Boot Jr. of Ashland, Nebraska who was disqualified due to a previous felony conviction. Hahn selected Wilcox, Nebraska farmer Steve Loschen as his Lieutenant Governor running mate and faced Nebraska party candidate Barry Richards, independent Mort Sullivan, and incumbent Republican Governor Dave Heineman in the November 7, 2006 general election which he lost with 24% of the vote.

References

External links
Campaign Website

1955 births
Living people
Nebraska Democrats
People from Schuyler, Nebraska
Politicians from Omaha, Nebraska
People from Stromsburg, Nebraska
Businesspeople from Omaha, Nebraska
Candidates in the 2006 United States elections
20th-century American businesspeople
21st-century American businesspeople
American technology chief executives
Sterling College alumni